Rewired is the sixth studio album by Mike + The Mechanics, released in 2004. This was the first album released by the band following the death of the co-lead singer Paul Young. Partly because of this, the album was credited to "Mike + The Mechanics + Paul Carrack". It is the only Mike + The Mechanics album to date with only one lead vocalist and the last to feature Paul Carrack.

The album was released in the UK as a standalone single CD and as a limited edition CD/DVD combo. The limited edition 2-disc set comprises the 9-track CD album plus a 10-track bonus PAL formatted DVD featuring a video for each song plus long and short versions of "One Left Standing". The album was eventually released in North America by Rhino Records in September 2005 as a single CD only.

In September 2004 the compilation album Rewired + Hits was issued in the UK, which repackaged Rewired and the 1996 compilation album Hits together as a double CD. The cover is a close up of part of the Rewired cover overlaid with both album covers side by side.

Mike Rutherford later called the album "dodgy", elaborating that "I look back at it and you know... we made the record, I didn't think too much about it, but later – I probably should not have done it. The chemistry with Carrack and Young was great, then we lost Paul Young and I kind of battled on – with some nice songs. I shouldn't have done it. And the sound on that – I don't like it."

Reception

In his review for Allmusic, Bruce Eder called Rewired "a fine record, a mix of pop/rock synth-orchestrated balladry that favorably recalls both the mid-'70s work of Genesis and the more pop-focused work of Phil Collins". He particularly praised Rutherford and McIntosh's playing and Carrack's vocals.

Track listing
 "One Left Standing" (Carrack, Rutherford, Sharon Woolf) – 5:11
 "If I Were You" (Carrack, B.A. Robertson, Rutherford) – 4:21
 "Perfect Child" (Carrack, Robertson, Rutherford) – 5:11
 "Rewired" (Will Bates, Carrack, Rutherford) – 5:31
 "I Don't Want It All" (Carrack, Rutherford) – 5:06
 "How Can I?" (Carrack, Rutherford) – 4:44
 "Falling" (Carrack, Rutherford, Woolf) – 5:17
 "Somewhere Along The Line" (Carrack, Robertson, Rutherford) – 3:52
 "Underscore" (Bates, Carrack, Rutherford) – 5:09

Personnel 
 Mike Rutherford – electric guitars, bass guitar, programming, backing vocals
 Paul Carrack – lead vocals, keyboards, electric guitars, drums

Additional personnel
 Will Bates – programming (1, 2, 4-9)
 Rupert Cobb – additional programming (1), programming (3), backing vocals 
 Ashley Clarke – additional programming
 Robbie McIntosh – electric guitars
 Ian Thomas – drums
 Neil Wilkinson – drums
 Peter Van Hooke – drums
 Ricky Hanley – backing vocals 
 Andrea Hunnisett – backing vocals
 Lisa Law – backing vocals 
 Owen Paul – backing vocals 
 Sharon Woolf – backing vocals

Production 
 Mike Rutherford – producer 
 Peter Van Hooke – producer 
 Will Bates – additional production, additional mixing (4, 9)
 Graham Bonnett – engineer, mixing 
 Nick Davis – vocal engineer 
 Ren Swan – additional mixing (1)
 Mark Taylor – additional mixing (1)
 Jeremy Wheatley – additional mixing (5)
 Ian Cooper – mastering 
 Tim Young – mastering 
 Jason Day – project coordinator 
 Hik Sasaki – project coordinator
 Darren Evans – art direction, design 

Studios
 Recorded at Fisher Lane Farm Studios (Surrey, UK).
 Drums recorded  at Abbey Road Studios (London, UK).
 Mixed at Metaphonic Studios (Surrey, UK).
 Mastered at Metropolis Mastering (London, UK).

DVD credits 
Movies researched and co-ordinated by Peter Van Hooke
Contributions by the National Film and Television School
Animation by Andy Frain and Touchwood Animation
Some movies provided by Isabelle Wuilmart, Will Bates, and Frank Laurin

References

Mike + The Mechanics albums
2004 albums
Albums produced by Mike Rutherford
Albums produced by Peter Van Hooke
Virgin Records albums